Milton Terris (April 22, 1915 – October 3, 2002) was an American public health physician and epidemiologist. He graduated from Columbia University in 1935 and completed his MD at the New York University School of Medicine in 1939 and his MPH from Johns Hopkins University in 1944. He was associate professor of preventive medicine at the State University of New York at Buffalo from 1951 through 1957, and was professor of epidemiology at Tulane University from 1958 through 1960. He was head of the Chronic Disease Unit of the New York City Public Health Research Institute from 1960 through 1963. In 1964 he became professor and chair of the department of preventive medicine at New York Medical College, serving in that role until his retirement in 1980.

He was president of the American Public Health Association from 1966 through 1967. In 1967, he co-founded the Society for Epidemiologic Research, a learned society for epidemiologists, and served as its first president. After retirement, he founded the Journal of Public Health Policy in 1980 and served as its editor until his death in 2002. He joined with several other past presidents of APHA in 1980 to found the National Association for Public Health Policy and served as president of that organization until 1993.

References

External links 
  American Public Health Association
  Journal of Public Health Policy
  National Association for Public Health Policy

1915 births
American public health doctors
Columbia University alumni
New York University Grossman School of Medicine alumni
Johns Hopkins Bloomberg School of Public Health alumni
2002 deaths
Physicians from New York City
Tulane University faculty
University at Buffalo faculty
Activists from New York City